Edward Walker (21 February 1816 – 2 or 8 June 1857) was an English academic and a cricketer who played a single first-class cricket match for Cambridge University in 1838. He was born at Oxford. His death is less certain: the directory of Cambridge alumni and cricket websites state that he died at Pau in France on 8 June 1857; contemporary records indicate he died on 2 June, and suggest his brother's house in London as a venue.

Walker was educated at Eton College and at King's College, Cambridge. As a cricketer, he played in his single first-class match in 1838 as a lower-order batsman, though it is not known whether he was right- or left-handed: he made two runs in his only innings. He played in other minor matches in both 1837 and 1840, but did not appear again in first-class cricket.

Walker graduated from Cambridge University with a Bachelor of Arts degree in 1839, and this converted to a Master of Arts in 1842. He became a fellow of King's College, and was also bursar, though the death notices for him in 1857 indicate that he had given up this role. He was also ordained as a Church of England priest, but there are no details of when and where.

References

1816 births
1857 deaths
English cricketers
Cambridge University cricketers
People educated at Eton College
Alumni of King's College, Cambridge
Fellows of King's College, Cambridge